Phil Hanson (born October 3, 1932) is a former member of the Arizona House of Representatives from January 2001 until January 2005. He was first elected to the House in November 2000, representing District 17, and was re-elected in 2002 after re-districting, to the 9th District. He ran for re-election in 2004, along with his fellow incumbent, Bob Stump, but lost in the Republican primary to Rick Murphy.

In 2004 he was inducted to the Arizona Veterans Hall of Fame for his civic and military service.

References

Republican Party members of the Arizona House of Representatives
1932 births
Living people